Dent is a surname. Notable people with the surname include:

Aileen Dent (1890–1978), Australian artist
Akeem Dent (born 1987), American football linebacker
Alan Dent (1905–1978), Scottish journalist, editor and writer
Albert W. Dent (1904–1984), an academic administrator
Alfred Dent (1844–1927), British businessman and founder of the North Borneo Chartered Company
Ancilla Dent (born 1933), English Roman Catholic nun, ecological activist, and writer
Andrew Dent (1955–2008), Australian doctor and humanitarian worker
Beryl May Dent (1900–1977), British mathematical physicist
Betty-Ann Dent (born 1950), retired American professional tennis player
Borden Dent (1938–2000), American geographer and cartographer
Bucky Dent (born 1951), American baseball player
Burnell Dent (born 1963), former professional American football linebacker
Catherine Dent (born 1965), American actress
Charles Dent (disambiguation), multiple people with the name (includes "Charlie")
Charles Enrique Dent (1911–1976), British biochemist
Charlie Dent (born 2006), English meteorologist
Charlie Dent (born 1960), Pennsylvanian politician
Chris Dent (born 1991), English cricketer
Clinton Thomas Dent (1850–1912), English alpinist, author and surgeon
Denny Dent (1948–2004), American speed painter
Digby Dent (disambiguation), father and son
Douglas Dent (1869–1959), Royal Navy officer
Eddie Dent (1887–1974), pitcher in Major League Baseball
Edith Vere Dent (1863–1948), amateur botanist and wild flower enthusiast
Edward John Dent (1790–1853), English watch maker
Edward Joseph Dent (1876–1957), English musicologist and biographer of Handel
Emma Dent (1823–1900), English antiquarian and collector
Eric Dent (born 1961), American complexity theorist
Francis Dent (1866–1955), British railway manager
Frederick B. Dent (1922–2019), United States Secretary of Commerce
Frederick Tracy Dent (1820–1892), American soldier
George Dent (1756–1813), American planter and politician from Maryland
Grace Dent (born 1973), English columnist, broadcaster and author
Harry Dent (disambiguation), multiple people with the name
J. M. Dent (1849–1926), British publisher
Jason Dent (born 1980), American mixed martial artist
John Dent (disambiguation), multiple people with the name
Julia Boggs Dent (1826–1902), wife of Ulysses Grant, the President of the United States
Lester Dent (1904–1959), writer best known for creating the character Doc Savage
Maggie Dent (born 1955), Australian parenting author
Martin Dent (academic) (1925–2014), English academic
Richard Dent (born 1960), former football player
Susie Dent (born 1964), English lexicographer
Taylor Dent (born 1981), American tennis player
Ted Dent (born 1969), Canadian ice hockey player and coach
Teresa Dent (born 1959), CEO, Game & Wildlife Conservation Trust
Thomas Dent (disambiguation), multiple people with the name
Vernon Dent (1895–1963), American actor
William Barton Wade Dent (1806–1855), American politician

Characters 
Arthur Dent, principal character in The Hitchhiker's Guide to the Galaxy
Random Frequent Flyer Dent, daughter of Arthur Dent
Hanzee Dent, character in the TV show Fargo
Harvey Dent (Two-Face), villain from Batman's rogue gallery
Fooly Dent, principal character in How to Treat a Lady Knight Right

See also 
Dent (disambiguation)

English-language surnames